Larry Grayson Smith (June 2, 1942 – August 12, 1973), born in Lenoir, North Carolina, United States, was a NASCAR driver. He made his debut in the 1971 World 600 in the #92 Ford, finishing 22nd. He would go on to run three more races that year, acquiring one top-ten finish. In 1972, he was named the first NASCAR Winston Cup Rookie of the Year, running 23 races and posting seven top-ten finishes. The next year, he finally acquired major sponsorship, from Carling Black Label.

Later that year, while running the Talladega 500, Smith spun his 1971 Mercury on lap 14 and slapped the Turn 1 retaining wall. His car suffered minor damage, which the crew was preparing to repair. However, during the ensuing caution flag, members of Smith's pit crew surprisingly discovered that the driver did not survive the impact of the crash; track doctors confirmed that he had died of massive head injuries.

An August 23, 1973 news report indicated that Smith's helmet had been sent to an independent testing laboratory for examination, to determine what role his helmet had in the injuries he sustained. It further reported that a study was underway to determine if safer helmets for drivers could be found.

A 1975 report stated that doctors determined that Smith's skull was "abnormally soft", and that it had been fractured several times before his fatal wreck.

It is rumored, but not confirmed, that the head injuries that killed Smith came because he tore the inner-lining out of his helmet, which had been bothering him for some time. He was pronounced dead on arrival at the Talladega Superspeedway infield hospital. No other drivers were involved in the crash.

Smith is one of several drivers featured in the 1975 book The World's Number One, Flat-Out, All-Time Great Stock Car Racing Book by Jerry Bledsoe. Bledsoe describes the struggles Smith went through in his run for Rookie Of The Year in 1972.

References

External links
 

1942 births
1973 deaths
NASCAR drivers
People from Lenoir, North Carolina
Racing drivers from North Carolina
Racing drivers who died while racing
Sports deaths in Alabama